The 2021 United States state legislative elections were held on November 2, 2021. Three legislative chambers in two states, New Jersey and Virginia, held regularly-scheduled elections. These off-year elections coincided with other state and local elections, including gubernatorial elections in both states.

As a result of the elections, New Jersey retained its Democratic trifecta, while a divided government was established in Virginia, as Republicans won back the lower house of the Virginia legislature, which they lost two years earlier.

Summary table 
Regularly-scheduled elections were held in 3 of the 99 state legislative chambers in the United States. Nationwide, regularly-scheduled elections were held for 220 of the 7,383 legislative seats. This table only covers regularly-scheduled elections; additional special elections took place concurrently with these regularly-scheduled elections.

State summaries

New Jersey 

All seats of the New Jersey Senate and the New Jersey General Assembly were up for election. In 2021, senators were elected to two-year terms in single-member districts, while Assembly members were elected to two-year terms in two-member districts. Democrats retained majority control in both chambers.

Virginia 

All seats of the Virginia House of Delegates are up for election; the Virginia Senate will not hold regularly-scheduled elections in 2021. Delegates are elected to two-year terms in single-member districts. Democrats recently gained control of the House in 2019. However, they lost their majority to the Republicans in this election.

Special elections 
Various states will hold special elections for legislative districts throughout the year.

Alabama

California

Connecticut

Georgia

Iowa

Kentucky

Louisiana

Maine

Massachusetts

Michigan

Mississippi

Missouri

New Hampshire

New York

Oklahoma

Pennsylvania

Rhode Island

Tennessee

Texas

Virginia

Wisconsin

Notes

References 

State legislative elections
 
2021